The 1978–79 Louisville Cardinals men's basketball team represented the University of Louisville during the 1978–79 NCAA Division I men's basketball season, Louisville's 65th season of intercollegiate competition. The Cardinals competed in the Metro Conference and were coached by Denny Crum. The team played home games at Freedom Hall.

The team completed a 24–8 record and reached the Sweet Sixteen of the 1979 NCAA Tournament.

Roster

Schedule 

|-
!colspan=12 style=| Regular season

|-
!colspan=12 style=| Metro Conference Tournament

|-
!colspan=12 style=| NCAA Tournament

Rankings

Team players drafted into the NBA

References

Louisville Cardinals
Louisville Cardinals men's basketball seasons
Louisville
Louisville Cardinals men's basketball, 1978-79
Louisville Cardinals men's basketball, 1978-79